Netlog (formerly known as Facebox and Bingbox) was a Belgian social networking service targeted at the global youth demographic. On Netlog, members could create their own web page, meet new people, chat, play games, share videos and post blogs.

The site was founded and launched in 1999 under the name ASL.TO in Ghent, Belgium, by Lorenz Bogaert and Toon Coppens. In 2002 the name of the website was changed into Redbox, a website targeted to the Belgian youth. Starting from 2005, it was available in other countries in and outside Europe. About one year later, the website was renamed ‘Netlog’. By 2007, Netlog had attracted 28 million members and kept on growing the years after. At its height, the site claimed to have over 94 million registered users across 20+ languages.

In January 2011, Netlog announced that the site would become part of Massive Media, a global media group, focusing mainly on social media, and allowing product portfolio to expand into new markets. They also own Twoo.com, a free social discovery platform launched in 2011, and Stepout, an application for meeting new people nearby (relaunched in late 2013). As of 2015, the homepage shows a sign it has been merged with Twoo. In July 2018 Netlog notified users that its security had been compromised in 2012 and logins and passwords of users were obtained by external agents. As of September 2018, Netlog's homepage informs that the website is no longer in service since 2015.

Feedback 
After joining the site, users could invite friends by e-mail or Facebook to join the network. In 2011, some users complained about the fact that this process was not clear enough. In the meantime, Netlog changed the flow on the website, making it more clear, and the number of complaints dropped.

Localization
Netlog had a localization technology ensuring that all content is geotargeted and personalized to each member's profile. This enabled a member to have localized searches and overviews on the community, displaying only those member profiles of his or her own age range and region.

Breach of 2012
In July 2018 Netlog sent out an email informing users registered before December 2012 that there was a security breach of their user database.

See also
 Social software

References

External links
Twoo Homepage (English)
Incrowd site - news page
Mashable's Social Networking Awards 2006
Facebox - Insane growth?
Red Herring Top 100 Europe Awards (winner), April, 2007

Internet properties established in 2000
Companies based in East Flanders
Defunct social networking services
Belgian social networking websites